Parastrongylaspis is a genus of beetles in the family Cerambycidae, containing the following species:

 Parastrongylaspis linsleyi Giesbert, 1987
 Parastrongylaspis thomasi Giesbert, 1992

References

Prioninae